Celebrity Cooks was a Canadian cooking show independently produced by Initiative Productions and aired on CBC Television from 1975 to 1979 and on Global from 1980 to 1987.  It was syndicated throughout Canada and the United States from 1980 to 1987.  In the early 1990s, it continued in syndication in Canada.  Barrie, Ontario-based CKVR later ran episodes in the 1990s that were also available in Toronto and surrounding areas for at least one season.

Bruno Gerussi hosted 478 episodes in total. He introduced celebrities, saw guests perform and chatted with them while preparing dishes for the audience.

The show began a successful run with the CBC and then moved to Global in 1980. In addition to the daytime programming, Global also developed 26 prime time episodes. The show continued to air in Canada with Global and on a few CBS owned-and-operated stations in the US until 1987. At that point, Initiative Productions and partners had produced 478 episodes.
 
Among the guests who appeared on the show was a pre-stardom David Letterman. 
Other guests included Margaret Trudeau (aired 3 February 1978), Jean Beliveau, Barry Morse and Elayne Boosler.

An episode featuring guest Bob Crane was recorded on January 28, 1978. Crane was murdered on June 29, making this his last TV appearance. The episode was scheduled to air in the U.S. in July 1978, however given the circumstances it did not air at all in the U.S.. The episode did air several times in Canada, beginning in February 1978. Crane was joking about the subject of death during the episode's taping, besides discussing Hogan's Heroes, the television series in which he starred. The taping of Crane's episode was recreated in the 2002 film, Auto Focus, in which actor John Kapelos portrayed Gerussi.

Hermione Gingold was the guest for the program's first broadcast on 15 September 1975.

Derek Smith, the creator of Celebrity Cooks, and now the executive producer with Upside Right Media Inc, is working to bring back the show in a new version with a new host.  The host for the new version of the show is actress and improv specialist Ellie Harvie in much the same format as the original show.

The show also led to the creation of Celebrity Cooks cook books:

1977: Celebrity Cooks, Recipe Book II (Fforbez Enterprises/Initiative Productions) , 
1979: The New Celebrity Cooks Cookbook (Methuen)

Key people
Creator: Derek Smith
Developed by: Derek Smith and Keith Large
Executive Producers: Keith Large and Derek Smith
Host: Bruno Gerussi
Musical Duo:Jim Walchuck and Henri Lorieau
Cooking Consultants: Helga Theilmann and Joan Mitchell (Season 1 & 2, Ottawa), Sue Morton & Chuck Norris (Seasons 3 to 12, Vancouver and Toronto)
Talent coordinator:Anne Kear
Executive Assistant to Derek Smith: Sharyn Manuel

References

External links
Official Celebrity Cooks with Bruno Gerussi Web Page
 TV Archive.ca:Celebrity Cooks Episode Guide 
Official Celebrity Cooks with Bruno Gerussi Facebook Page
Internet Movie Database: Celebrity Cooks
TV Archive: Celebrity Cooks
Queen's University Directory of CBC Television Series: Celebrity Cooks

1975 Canadian television series debuts
1987 Canadian television series endings
CBC Television original programming
1970s Canadian variety television series
1980s Canadian variety television series
Global Television Network original programming
1970s Canadian cooking television series
1980s Canadian cooking television series